This is a list of drugs and substances that are known or suspected to cause Stevens–Johnson syndrome.

Drug eruptions